Gaccha, alternatively spelled as Gachchha, is a monastic order, along with lay followers, of the image worshipping Murtipujaka Svetambara sect of Jainism. The term is also used in the Digambara sect.

Etymology 
Gaccha literally means "who travel together".

History 
According to Jain tradition, in the first century, Vajrasensuri established four Kulas, subdivisions within the Swetambara Murtipujaka Jain community, to divide the community during time of drought to disperse them. They were: Chandra, Nirvriti, Vidyadhar and Nagendra. During 1000 to 1300 CE, the Gaccha replaced these Kula as basic divisions of community.

Although some 84 separate gacchas have appeared since the 7th–8th century, only a few have survived, such as the Kharatara (located mainly in Rajasthan), the Tapa, the Achala, the Paichand or Pashwachandra, the Vimal and the Tristutik Gaccha. While the gacchas do not differ from one another in matters of doctrine, they do differ on issues of practice, in particular those practices relating to the sacred calendar and to ritual. The various gacchas also trace their descent through different lineages.

Former 84 Gacchas
The number of 84 Gacchas is still spoken of by the Jains, but the lists that have been hitherto published are very discordant. The following was obtained from a member of the sect as being their recognized list,--and allowing for differences of spelling, nearly every name may be recognised in those previously published by Mr. H. G. Briggs or Colonel Miles.

The eighty four Gacchas of the Jains:

Present Gacchas

Tapa Gaccha was founded by Jagatchandrasuri in Vikram Samvat 1285 (1229 CE). He was given the title of "Tapa" (i.e., the meditative one) by the ruler of Mewar. It was a branch of the Brihad Gaccha founded by Udyotan Suri. Vijaydevsuri (1600–1657 AD) is considered one of major leader of lineage. They reformed monastic order of Svetambara Jainism.  As a result of this reform, most Svetambara Jain monks today belong to Tapa Gaccha.

Kharatara Gaccha was founded by Vardhamana Suri (till 1031). His teacher was a temple-dwelling monk. He rejected him because of not following texts. His pupil, Jineshvara, got honorary title 'Kharatara' (Sharp witted or Fierce) because he defeated Suracharya, leader of Chaityavasis in public debate in 1023 at Anahilvada Patan. So the Gaccha got his title. Another tradition regards Jinadatta Suri (1075-1154) as a founder of Gaccha.

Other major Gacchas are Anchal Gaccha and Pashwachandra Gaccha.

Tristutik Gaccha was founded by Acharya Rajendrasuri in 1194 AD ( Vikram Samvat 1250.)

Presiding deities
Adhishthayak Deva or presiding deities are protector deities of followers of each Gaccha. They are as follows: Manibhadra Vira of Tapa Gaccha; Ambika and Bhairava of Khartara Gaccha; Kalika and Chakreshvari of Anchala Gaccha; Batuk Bhairava of Pashwachandra Gaccha.

References 

Śvētāmbara sects